Tucker is an unincorporated community in Anderson County, located within the U.S. state of Texas. According to the Handbook of Texas, the community had a population of 304 in 2000. It is located within the Palestine, Texas micropolitan area.

History
The community's first church, named Green Bay African Methodist Episcopal Church, came together by a group of African Americans who worked in the cotton plantation in nearby Long Lake. It had two separate neighborhoods: Prairie Point, where the community's White residents lived, and Green Bay, where the community's Black inhabitants resided. The International and Great Northern Railroad had a track built through the settlement in 1872 and a post office by the name of Prairie Point was established in 1873. Both it and the community changed their name to Tucker, in which a family with the same last name owned land and operated a general store in the community in 1882. It was also named after a man named W.H. Tucker, who was also a member of the same family. It consisted of a steam-powered gristmill and cotton gin, a church, and 40 occupants. It shipped cotton, cottonseed, and fish. It had an estimated population of 150 in 1896 and the post office was shut down in 1905. A man named A.L. Bowers drilled many unsuccessful wells in Tucker in 1913. However, it was revived by the Tidewater and Texas Seaboard Oil Company, which created numerous oil and gas wells that became profitable in the community as well as nearby Long Lake in both 1932 and 1933. Then, a refinery was built next to the community's railroad. It had 60 residents in the 1930s and at the end of that decade, it consisted of two churches, three businesses, a factory, and numerous tanks that stored oil. Its population fell to 40 in 1964 and had around 65 to 85 residents in the late 1960s and early 1970s. It had reached its population zenith of 304 residents from 1978 through 2000. The community then consisted of three churches, several scattered homes and oil tanks, and an oil refinery not that far north. The nearby oilfield continued to operate in 1984, but it eventually shut down in 1992.

Geography

Education
A school called Green Bay was located in the community for the settlement's African American students and was eventually converted into a black high school. Another school opened for white students in 1884. Both of these schools served an estimated 42 White students and 86 Black students in 1932, and then became a part of the Westwood Independent School District not long after. The community continues to be served by the Westwood ISD to this day.

References

Unincorporated communities in Anderson County, Texas
Unincorporated communities in Texas